The University for Peace (UPEACE) is an international, graduate-only research university and intergovernmental organization. The university was established as a treaty organisation by the United Nations General Assembly in 1980.

Each year, the University for Peace selects approximately 200 students globally for a master's programme (MA or MSc) related to the study of peace and conflict, environment and development, or international law. The university also offers a doctoral programme and executive education.

The headquarters of the University for Peace are in located in a nature reserve in San José Province, Costa Rica. However, the university also has offices for education, research and other projects in the United States, Honduras, Germany, Switzerland, the Netherlands, Ethiopia, the Philippines, China and Italy. It is also active in Somalia through the Institute for Peace, Security and Development.

The charter of the University for Peace, adopted by the General Assembly in resolution 35/55 in 1980, defines the mission of the university as follows: "to provide humanity with an international institution of higher education for peace with the aim of promoting among all human beings the spirit of understanding, tolerance and peaceful coexistence, to stimulate cooperation among peoples and to help lessen obstacles and threats to world peace and progress, in keeping with the noble aspirations proclaimed in the Charter of the United Nations."

History 

The creation of the University for Peace was set in motion by a treaty and endorsed by resolution 34/111 of 14 December 1979 of the United Nations General Assembly. By this resolution, the UN General Assembly established an international commission which, in collaboration with the government of Costa Rica, was requested to prepare the organization, structure and setting in motion of the University for Peace. Thereafter, by Resolution 35/55 of 5 December 1980, the UN General Assembly endorsed the treaty establishing the University for Peace by adopting the International Agreement for the Establishment of the University for Peace along with the Charter of the University for Peace. The university has the unique status of not only being a dedicated institution for higher education in peace and conflict studies, but also an international treaty body organization mandated by the UN General Assembly.

Relationship with United Nations 

The University for Peace is part of the academic wing of the UN system, and has observer status at the UN General Assembly, while maintaining its independence in academic, financial and management matters. The UN Secretary-General is the honorary president of UPEACE. As the university is mandated by the General Assembly, the UN Secretary-General reports periodically on the activities of the University for Peace.

The main body of governance of the university is the Council of the University for Peace. It is composed of 17 members, ten of which appointed by the Secretary-General of the UN and the Director-General of UNESCO, two are nominated by the government of Costa Rica, and others are high-level staff of the University for Peace, the United Nations University and the United Nations.

Headquarters and main campus 

The main campus of the university - the Rodrigo Carazo Campus - is located 30 km south-west of San José, Costa Rica. Most master's and doctoral programmes are administered from this location. Students coming from several countries study in a highly multi-cultural environment on the campus. The university has a mix of both resident and visiting faculty members. 

The university also carries out hands-on training beyond its master's and doctoral programmes aimed at practitioners and policymakers rather than graduate students. The university has established two centres for this purpose that are located on the main campus. The UPEACE Centre for Executive Education delivers training courses to people in leadership positions. The centre caters to non-profit leaders, business executives, educators, UN staff, students and other professional audiences. The university has also started administering distance education courses, including an online master's programme from the main campus. 

The University for Peace has also established the UPEACE Human Rights Centre which was created within the contours of the broader mission of the university. The work of the UPEACE Human Rights Centre seeks to promote understanding, respect and enjoyment of universal human rights. The centre carries out this objective through human rights education, training, research, capacity building and awareness raising activities. 

The closest town to the mountain on which the university is perched is Ciudad Colón, which is where most of the students, staff and faculty members of the university reside.

Earth Charter Initiative 
The main campus of the University for Peace hosts the International Secretariat of the Earth Charter Initiative, whose stated mission is "to promote the transition to sustainable ways of living and a global society founded on a shared ethical framework that includes respect and care for the community of life, ecological integrity, universal human rights, respect for diversity, economic justice, democracy, and a culture of peace." This mission is carried out using 'The Earth Charter' as the principal guiding framework. The Earth Charter is an international declaration of fundamental values and principles considered useful by its supporters for building a just, sustainable, and peaceful global society in the 21st century. 

In 2012, the Earth Charter Initiative and the University for Peace were jointly awarded the UNESCO Chair on Education for Sustainable Development and the Earth Charter. The work related to this UNESCO chair will be carried out at the newly constructed 'Earth Charter Center for Education for Sustainable Development' at the UPEACE main campus.

Peace Park and nature reserve 
The campus is surrounded by a natural reserve composed of a secondary forest and the last remnant of primary forest (200 ha) in the Central Valley of Costa Rica. Hence, this protected area is very rich in fauna. It shelters mammals such as monkeys and deer; reptiles; and over 300 species of birds, as well as approximately 100 varieties of trees. The university's installations and protected area make up 303 ha.

International activities 

In addition to the activities at the Costa Rica campus, the University for Peace has several international offices and partners.

Africa 
The University for Peace established its Africa program in 2002. The programme aims to stimulate and strengthen the capacities in Africa to teach, train and conduct research in areas of peace and conflict studies.

The first five years of the program focused on the development of curricula and teaching materials and the delivery of a range of short courses, workshops, conferences and seminars in various parts of Africa. Within this period, the program attracted close to one thousand participants from academia, policy-makers and civil society organizations.

Since 2007, the Africa programme has worked with a number of partner universities to develop master's degree programs to be based at African universities. The principal aim of this endeavour is to further strengthen the African capacity and build a wide expertise for a better understanding of conflicts in Africa, their prevention and the creation of the environment favourable to lasting peace and development in the region.

Europe 
In January 2012, UPEACE opened a centre in The Hague, Netherlands, which is housed at the Academy Building of the Peace Palace, next to the Hague Academy of International Law. UPEACE The Hague focuses on education and research in peace studies, cooperating with academic and policy-oriented institutions in The Hague region. UPEACE The Hague is active in three fields: peace and conflict studies, water and peace, and urban peace and security. In addition, the centre organises professional trainings, lectures, seminars, and workshops on theory, practice and policy. 

The Geneva Office of the University for Peace was established in 2001. The focus of  the Geneva office is to contribute to the development of programmatic activities of the university in Africa and the Middle East, engaging with the academic community in Geneva, and facilitation of institutional relations within Europe and with the United Nations system.

In November 2015, University for Peace started its work in Rome under the name "Università Internazionale per la Pace" (UniPace).

Asia 
The University for Peace jointly organises the Asian Peacebuilders Scholarship Programme (APS) with the Nippon Foundation and Ateneo de Manila University. APS students obtain a Master of Arts Degree from the University for Peace and a master's degree in Transdisciplinary Social Development from Ateneo de Manila University.

Affiliated institutions 
The University for Peace has signed agreements with the governments of Serbia (formerly Yugoslavia), Colombia and Uruguay to open centres in those three countries. These centres have the necessary legal status to enjoy autonomy and academic freedom while keeping their humanistic purpose within the framework of both the Charter of the University for Peace and the Charter of the United Nations and the Universal Declaration of Human Rights.

The European Centre for Peace and Development (ECPD) in Belgrade, Serbia; the World Centre for Training and Research in Conflict Resolution (WCCR) in Bogotá, Colombia; and the World Centre for Research for Peace (CMIP) in Montevideo, Uruguay, have developed close links with their respective governments while being key UPEACE partners in areas of common interest. UPEACE keeps operational agreements with them and lends its logos when necessary to undertake joint activities within the framework of UPEACE's and the Centers’ mission. These activities, as with other partners, involve the cooperating parties working together at all stages of jointly agreed-upon projects.

Academics 
The University for Peace offers graduate and doctoral programmes in the areas of peace and conflict studies, environment and development and international.

Department of International Law
MA in International Law and the Settlement of Disputes
MA in International Law and Human Rights
MA in International Law and Diplomacy
Maestría en Derecho Internacional de los Derechos Humanos (taught in Spanish)

Department of Peace and Conflict Studies 
MA in Gender and Peacebuilding
MA in Indigenous Science and Peace Studies
MA in International Peace Studies
MA in Media and Peace
MA in Peace Education
MA in Religion, Culture and Peace Studies
MA in Sustainable Peace in the Contemporary World (online)
Maestría en Resolución de Conflictos, Paz y Desarrollo (taught in Spanish)

Department of Environment and Development 
MA in Environment, Development and Peace
MA in Responsible Management and Sustainable Economic Development
MSc in Ecology and Society

Dual and joint degrees
Dual MA in Natural Resources and Sustainable Development (with American University, Washington DC, USA)
Water Cooperation and Diplomacy (with IHE Delft Institute for Water Education, The Netherlands and Oregon State University, USA)
Dual degree in Environmental Law (LLM, Pace University) and International Law and Human Rights
MA in Development Studies and Diplomacy (with UNITAR)
Asian Peacebuilders Scholarship, a dual-campus MA in Transdisciplinary Social Development (with Ateneo de Manila University, The Philippines)
Joint MA degree in Human Rights and a Culture for Peace (with Pontifical Xavierian University, Colombia)
LL.M in Transnational Crime and Justice (with United Nations Interregional Crime and Justice Research Institute, Turin, Italy)
Dual MA in Conflict Resolution and Coexistence (Brandeis University, US) and International Law and Human Rights
Dual MA in International Law and Human Rights (with Hankuk University of Foreign Studies, Seoul, Korea)
Dual MA in Media, Peace and Conflict Studies (with Hankuk University of Foreign Studies, Seoul, Korea)
Dual MA in Sustainable Development (with Hankuk University of Foreign Studies, Seoul, Korea)

Study abroad programs
UPEACE offers graduate and advance undergraduate students from other institutions the opportunity to enroll in UPEACE's Study Abroad Program (SAP) in two ways:
Semester Abroad Program
Undergraduate Credit Building

Distance education courses
Apart from its online MA in Sustainable Peace in the Contemporary World, UPEACE offers a series of individual online courses that can be taken for academic credits or for certificates.

Doctoral program
The University for Peace has a doctoral programme in peace and conflict studies since 2012. The programme offers a research track and a professional track.

Accreditation 

The Charter of the University for Peace gives the authority to UPEACE to "grant master's degrees and doctorates". As the resolution to establish the University for Peace was taken by consensus in the General Assembly, the authorisation to award degrees is legally valid in all countries as per international law.

Many programmes at the campus in Costa Rica are also accredited by the Costa Rican accreditation organisation SINAES, or are in the process of obtaining accreditation. Accreditation in Costa Rica is not mandatory.

University for Peace degrees are verified by the International Association of Universities/UNESCO.

Outreach 

The U.S. Association for the University for Peace is a 501(c)(3) nonprofit organization established in 2006 to advance the University for Peace and the practice of education for peace in the United States. UPEACE/US projects include DCPEACE, an initiative to empower teachers, youth, and families with the skills and knowledge necessary to effectively serve as peacebuilders in their communities and Peace Rooms, a program that connect classrooms of middle school students from Costa Rica and Washington, D.C., through the use of virtual networking technology for the purpose of developing core concepts of global citizenship and peace education.

Notable alumni and students 

 Hassan Sheikh Mohamud, president of Somalia (Ph.D.)
 Anat Nir, Israeli businessperson and LGBT rights activist
 Kirthi Jayakumar, Indian peace educator, feminist activist and writer
 Rosebell Kagumire, Ugandan journalist
 Abdullahi Mohammed Odowa, Somalian ambassador to Kuwait
 Adilia Caravaca, International President of Women's International League for Peace and Freedom
 José Antonio Sanahuja, Full professor of International Relations at Complutense University of Madrid

See also 

 Culture of Peace
 Earth Charter Initiative
 UNESCO
 United Nations
 The U.S. Association for the University for Peace
 Peace and conflict studies
 Religion and peacebuilding
 List of peace activists

References 

Schools of international relations
Peace and conflict studies
Universities in Costa Rica
Intergovernmental universities
Peace education
Educational institutions established in 1980
Buildings and structures in San José Province